The heterometallic copper-aluminum superatom is a Mackay‐Type Cluster with formula [Cu43Al12](Cp*)12. It is an open‐shell 67‐electron superatom.

At the time of its synthesis, it was the largest superatom to be synthesized. Its two distinct features are its large electron count compared to other heterometallic superatoms and its unprecedented electron structure of an open-shell configuration.

This is the very first example of a ligated heterometallic Mackay-type cluster, which is an extremely complex crystal structure whose surface is composed of two-shell 20 equilateral triangles composed of 55 copper and aluminum atoms. This shape is also called an icosahedron. The 43 copper and 12 aluminum atoms form a superatom by the metals forming a shared electron shell that resembles a single metal atom. Through magnetic data and analysis at the DFT level it shows that this superatom has a very unique electronic structure of the cluster which is a 67-electron open jellium shell [Cu43Al12]12+ core, protected by twelve Cp* ligands. These crystals have the chemical properties of individual copper atoms. They are attracted by a magnetic field, or paramagnetic due to three valence electrons in the outermost shell whose spin align themselves in a magnetic field.  Another property of this compound is that it is pyrophoric, or can ignite spontaneously when exposed to air, so it is highly sensitive to the air and moisture. Also, this compound cannot be re-dissolved in any solvent without decomposition, which means extensive characterization of the compound cannot be obtained with high-resolution mass spectrometry or solution NMR spectroscopy. Thus X-ray diffraction structural analysis of the data obtained does not meet the accepted high-quality requirements, due to the compound forming relatively small, weakly diffracting cubes when using single crystals.

Synthesis
Fischer's lab team designed the material by building compounds made of individual copper and aluminum atoms. For this superatom, a mixture of aluminium atoms complexed with pentamethylcyclopentadiene (Cp*) and copper atoms complexed with mesitylene (Mes) were combined in an inert atmosphere.

[AlCp*]4 + [CuMes]5 → [Cu43Al12](Cp*)12

After adding a solvent, the copper and aluminum atoms spontaneously separated from the organic compounds and formed the superatom cluster. The exergonic nature of the reaction demonstratesg that this specific arrangement of copper and aluminum atoms is stable.

References

External links
 https://iscr.univ-rennes1.fr/umr/news/article/open-shell-67-electron-superatom?lang=en

Cluster chemistry
Copper compounds
Aluminium compounds
Cyclopentadienyl complexes